Mujigae (무지개) means rainbow in Korean. It could refer to one of the following:
-tteok
Tropical Storm 
Typhoon